"Meet in the Middle" is a song by Swedish DJ, producer, and remixer StoneBridge featuring American singer/songwriter Haley Joelle, who wrote the song in 2016 at age 16 with producer/songwriter Richard Harris, who initially passed the demo to StoneBridge and immediately recorded the track afterwards. The single is the third number one for StoneBridge and the first for Joelle in the United States, where it topped the Billboard Dance Club Songs in its 17 February 2018 issue.

Track listing
 Digital download 

Meet in the Middle (feat. Haley Joelle) [StoneBridge Radio] 3:07
Meet in the Middle (feat. Haley Joelle) [Damien Hall Ibiza Mix] 2:58
Meet in the Middle (feat. Haley Joelle) [Chris Sammarco Remix] 3:01
Meet in the Middle (feat. Haley Joelle) [StoneBridge Extended Mix] 5:41
Meet in the Middle (feat. Haley Joelle) [Damien Hall Extended Ibiza Mix] 4:41
Meet in the Middle (feat. Haley Joelle) [Chris Sammarco Extended Remix] 5:40

Charts

Weekly charts

Year-end charts

See also
 List of number-one dance singles of 2018 (U.S.)

References

External links
 

2017 songs
2018 singles
Dance-pop songs
House music songs
Eurodance songs
Electronic songs